Between 1936 and 1942, South Australian Railways built 36 steel carriages at its Islington Railway Workshops. All were painted cream and green being repainted maroon and silver in the 1960s. Aside from a few written off after accidents, all passed to Australian National in March 1978.

In the early 1980s, 14 were sold to SteamAge to operate charther services out of Melbourne. In 1987, these were sold to Australian Vintage Travel and converted to standard gauge for use on the Southern Cross Express luxury train in New South Wales. After this ceased, the carriages were sold to Northern Rivers Railroad for use on its Ritz Rail tourist train on the Murwillumbah line. They were stored at Junee Locomotive Depot before moving to Casino in October 1996.

A few remained in service when Australian National's passenger operations were sold to Great Southern Rail in November 1997. Four were passed to West Coast Railway in 1994. Others were sold to SteamRanger. Today many are owned by Steamrail Victoria.

Some sources list the twenty-three 800, 850 and 860 class carriages as part of this fleet, but those are covered on the suburban trailers page.

History
During the 1930s, the South Australian Railways were undergoing a massive quality increase under Commissioner Webb. After addressing the serious deficiencies in locomotives and freight rolling stock, Webb turned his attention to the quality of passenger accommodation on longer runs around the state. To address these failings, a new fleet of steel passenger carriages were constructed at Islington Railway Workshops, with the first entering service in 1936.

Services

Design
The first 12 cars were of a similar external design; first class carriages were numbered 500 through 503, and second class carriages 600 to 607, in keeping with Webb's preference for numeric over alphabetic categorisation. All cars were painted green with a cream band along the windows, and black for the undergear and roofs. Bogies were fitted with plain bearings, to accelerate construction and reduce costs. The cars were fitted with folding stairs at the four corners, to provide platform-level and ground-level access.

All twelve were end-vestibule compartment-type carriages; the first class cars had room for 42 passengers across seven compartments, and the second class carriages sat 64 in 8 compartments. Each compartment was accessed by twin wooden sliding doors, with etched glass panels fitted. Toilets and were provided at the vestibules. The interior of each car was fitted with polished timber panels, chrome fittings and drop-down windows; and the first-class carriages had mirrors between compartments, and arm rests between each seat.

The cars experienced a very positive public reaction, and so construction continued with a new series of saloon carriages. These would become the 700, 750 and 780 class cars, with modified window spacings and slightly shorter bodies. These cars had a central aisle with seats either side and toilets in the centre (dividing the smoking and non-smoking sections). Cars 700-715 were exclusively second class, for 56 passengers across 14 bays of four seats; 750-753 were composite first (22) and second (24); and 780-783 were exclusively first class, with two seats on one side of the aisle and four on the other, for a total capacity of 38 passengers.

In the 1940s, several of the 700 class cars were fitted with carpet and higher quality seating, to match the standards of first class vehicles.

The drop-down windows eventually presented maintenance problems, so they were replaced with half-drop windows instead; the lower half of the window was fixed in place.

The cars were eventually repainted to maroon and silver in the late 1960s, to match the scheme of the newer air conditioned vehicles in use on the Overland and other trains.

Details

500 class

600 class

700 class

750 class

780 class

In 1973, car 783 was converted to a "departmental car". This involved stripping the interior, and fitting a kitchen and sleeping compartments for up to eight people, as support for the ViceRegal car and Commissioner's Car Murray. The car was fitted with a 3-phase power supply, and this was used when the vehicle was included in the Commissioners' Train. As rebuilt, the car was painted red and allocated the code DC783. No airconditioning was fitted; the bogies had come from the Cafeteria Car, which had been shifted across to Commonwealth style bogies.

It was a common sight on broad gauge passenger trains to Port Pirie circa 1978, when it provided head-end power for an RBJ buffet car while the Cafeteria Car was unavailable.

When the South Australian Railways was sold to the Commonwealth in 1975 (to become Australian National Railways, later Australian National), the vehicle was retained by the South Australian State Government. It was officially withdrawn in 1986, then leased to SteamRanger and named Lowanna in 1990. In 1995 the car was transferred to become a static exhibit at the Port Dock Railway Museum, and ten years later it was sold privately to a Victorian individual, who placed the car under the care of the Victorian Goldfields Railway in Maldon. In 2022, the car was sold to 707 Operations.

Construction

In Service

South Australian Railways (1936-1975)
When the cars first entered service they were used on fixed consists for specific rosters. As the fleet grew they replaced many of the older vehicles, which were progressively scrapped or held for occasional use, like the Centenary Train.

Through the 1960s, the carriages had their windows replaced, and the exteriors were repainted from the green/cream/black scheme to the newer red/silver scheme, to match the livery applied to the newer air conditioned fleet and diesel locomotives.

In 1962 car 705 caught fire, and the following year it was condemned, written off and scrapped.

Standard Gauge use (1968-1974)
In December 1968 four compartment carriages were converted to standard gauge, for use on the first runs between Peterborough and Broken Hill. The cars were 500, 501, 600 and 601, and these were included in the first passenger run on the new line, on 16 January 1969.

600 returned to broad gauge in 1972, and the other three in 1974, as they were superseded by other stock.

Australian National (1975-1997)
The South Australian Railways was sold to the Australian federal government in 1975, and most of the rolling stock was included in that transfer. DC783 ex No.783 was retained by the State for special occasions; with 705 scrapped, that left 34 broad gauge carriages to be transferred.

Standard Gauge use (1977-1991)
In July 1977, three cars were transferred across to standard gauge for fast, mixed goods services. Cars 780, 781 and 782 became BF cars 343, 344 and 345 respectively. The BF code was defined as "non-airconditioned economy class sitting car with cooking facilities". It is not clear where any such cooking facilities may have been constructed, but they may have taken over the space previously allocated to the short (3-window) saloon. The cars were repainted into red with a tan roof, black undergear and silver stripes to match the scheme of the short-haul Commonwealth Railways passenger stock.

In November of the same year, 750 was transferred to standard gauge as BE346, a regular economy-class sitting carriage. It was followed in 1979 by 752 as BE351 and 1980 by 753 as BE352 and 751 as BE358.

In 1983 two cars were burnt; BE352 had one end destroyed on 13 August, so it was written off. BF344's interior was obliterated a few months later, such that the car shell was tipped off the track to recover only the bogies. Both were last noted at Stirling North in early 1988.

In 1990 cars BF343, BE346, BE351 and BE358 were stored at Port Pirie, leaving BF345 as the only class member still in service with Australian National. It was written off in November 1992, but instead of scrapping the vehicle was seconded to Islington Railway Workshops for refurbishment as an additional vehicle for The Explorer.

V/Line (1983-1992)
When V/Line introduced their New Deal in 1981, the intention was to provide an all-steel, all-airconditioned fleet of carriages and to abolish the use of older, timber-bodied cars. The fleet was not quite sufficient to achieve this goal immediately, and so while the Harris carriages were undergoing refurbishment, V/Line agreed to hire some carriages from Australian National, from 8 March 1983. The cars initially transferred were 702, 703 and 715. During the repaint and restoration, car 715 was found to have significant rust problems, and so it was returned in May 1983. In its place, Australian National sent over 500, on 16 September 1983, and 600, on 30 September 1983.

The cars were refurbished and painted in the older Victorian Railways scheme of blue with gold stripes, to avoid the implication that the vehicles were of the same quality as newer, air-conditioned stock. They were used as a fixed consist on runs that would later be handed over to H sets. While in V/Line service they were classed BK1 and BK2, AK1 and BKL3, ex 702, 703, 500 and 600 respectively. BK1 was the first to enter service on 3 June 1983, followed by BK2 on 13 August 1983, AK1 on 17 October 1983 and BKL3 on 14 December 1983.

Circa 1986, 1AK was reclassed as Economy in place of First Class, to better match with the short-haul H type rosters. It is not known if the capacity of the car was increased from 42 to 56 by replacing seats, but that is unlikely.

In 1991 2BK had one of its toilet compartments converted to a conductor office area, eliminating the need for a guard's van to be included in the consist.

During the V/Line era, car 607 was sold privately, refurbished, painted blue and gold and reclassed 1BH. It was offered to V/Line for use on regular services but deemed unnecessary, and in 1987 it was restored to its previous identity.

The Explorer (1993)
The four V/Line cars were returned to Australian National on 13 July 1992, and placed into storage. After a short period they were refurbished and repainted into a blue, yellow and white scheme for a new tourist train called The Explorer, but the project was soon abandoned and the cars were returned to indefinite storage. Cars BE358 (ex 751) and BF345 (ex 782) were to be included in the project, but the refurbishment had not started when it became clear that the project was short-lived.

Disposal
In 1981 most of Australian National's fleet of non-airconditioned vehicles was sold off.

Cars 503, 602, 606, 701, 704, 706, 710 and 712 were purchased by SteamRanger and restored for use on their line.

Cars 501, 502, 601, 603, 604, 605, 607, 700, 707, 708, 709, 711, 713 and 714 were purchased by SteamAge and transferred to Victoria, with the intent to operate mainline tours behind locomotive R766.

The three standard gauge vehicles remaining, BF343 (ex 780), BE346 (ex 750) and BE351 (ex 752), were railed from Port Pirie to Murwillumbah in 1991, following a sale from Australian National to the Northern Rivers Railroad.

Cars 500, 600, 702, 703, 751 and 782 were retained by Australian National up its sale of stock to Great Southern Rail in 1997.

Great Southern Railway
The breakup and sale of Australian National from 1992 finally caught up with the fleet, and on 1 November 1997 the remaining six vehicles - 500, 600, 702, 703, 751 and 782 - were included in the sale of rollingstock to Great Southern Rail. The company had very little use for 60-year-old, non-airconditioned stock, and so they were on-sold in June 1998 to Steamrail Victoria.

The cars were transferred on standard gauge bogies to Melbourne.

In Preservation

Steamranger
Cars 503, 602, 606, 701, 704, 706, 710 and 712 were purchased by SteamRanger in 1981 and restored for use on their line. 602 was modified during the restoration, becoming a 24-seat tavern/refreshhment car, with a brake and guard compartment at one end. In the new form it was named Bowmans, and it entered service in 1983. Car 715 was owned by SteamRanger for a short period up to 1999, when it was onsold to Steve Moritz for his Murraylander project.

Murraylander
In 2000 two of the cars, 606 and 712, were sold by SteamRanger to Steve Moritz following his purchase of 715. 606 was purchased by the Port Dock Railway Museum at the end of 2000 and delivered in 2001; expressions of interest were sought by the Australian Locomotive and Railway Carriage Co for sale of 712 and 715 in 2010. Around the same time, ALRCCo organised the sale and transfer of car 714 from Steamrail to Tailem Bend.

SteamAge Australia
In 1981 SteamAge Australia purchased fourteen of the carriages, and these were railed from Adelaide to Melbourne departing 3 December 1981 as a single consist. The cars were planned to be refurbished and named after Victorian lakes. The inaugural run of the Melbourne Limited fleet, with some of the newly refurbished carriages, was on Saturday 15 June 1986 to Swan Hill.

Cars 501, 502, 601, 604, 604, 605, 607, 700, 707, 708, 709, 711, 713 and 714 were included in the purchase.

Within a few years most had been restored for service; they became Weeroona (ex 501), Burrumbeet (ex 502), Lauriston (ex 603), Corangamite (ex 604), Wendouree (ex 605), Johnnie Walker (club car ex 707), and Eppalock (power car ex 713). All cars had been restored to variant of the South Australian Railways' original green with cream livery. 607 had been onsold privately and restored as 1BH in Victorian Railways blue and gold, and offered to V/Line for their use; the offer was knocked back, and the car is only thought to have run in a few enthusiast specials.

At various points the fleet had been paired with CP vans 24, 30 and 35.

In 1987 SteamAge collapsed, and the vehicles were sold to Australian Vintage Travel.

Australian Vintage Travel
When SteamAge collapsed in 1987 the fleet was sold to Australian Vintage Travel and converted to standard gauge, for a service called The Southern Cross Express. 607/BH1 was included in the sale, and it along with the seven restored cars were converted across to standard gauge. They were joined by Wedgewood, a dining car converted from 602, and the first run of this consist was to Seymour on Friday 11 December 1987, followed with a promotional tour to Canberra on Friday 22nd to Sunday 24 January 1988.

The company went into receivership in July 1988, and all the vehicles were put out to tender. Cars 501 and 707 were sold privately; the remaining standard gauge cars were sold to the Northern Rivers Scenic Railway in New South Wales, along with 708 which had been partway through conversion to a second club car (to be named Wellington), and the uncompleted 700, 709, 711 and 714 were left in storage at Steamrail's compound in Newport, Victoria.

Northern Rivers Scenic Railway
The NRSR intended to use the cars for services in northern New South Wales on the Murwillumbah line. On 29 December 1989 the eight cars already on standard gauge were transferred to Goulburn roundhouse as a temporary staging point before later being shifted further north. In 1991 they were joined by the three cars which had been stored at Port Pirie - 750, 752 and 780.

In 1999 the complete ex-SteamAge Northern Rivers fleet entered service as their Ritz Rail train, with sitting cars Oxley (ex 502), Clarence (ex 603), Wilsons (ex 604), Brunswick (ex 605), dining cars Tweed (ex 601) and Richmond (ex 607), club car Cape Byron (ex 708) and Power Car (ex 713). It appears that cars 750, 752 and 780 may not have re-entered service at the time, and their whereabouts following the sale of the rest of the fleet is unknown.

In May 2004 the Ritz Rail train was transferred from Murwillumbah to Lithgow for long-term storage, and in 2010 the fleet was shifted to Parkes for a stock auction.

West Coast Railway
In 1994 West Coast Railway acquired the remaining four cars from Newport - 700, 709, 711 and 714. These were transferred to Ballarat Workshops for restoration, and within a few years three of them had re-entered service as excursion class vehicles. 709 was kept at Ballarat as a source of spare parts.

When the company folded the four vehicles were sold to Steamrail. While in West Coast Railways service they used the code BK, following on from V/Line's use of that code for 702 and 703 in the period 1983-1992.

Private sales
When Australian Vintage Travel folded, two of their vehicles were sold privately.

Weeroona, previously car 501, was sold in 1989 and re-entered service in 1993 with an end deck, kitchen and dining facilities, and only three compartments retained. It was named Terra Australis and coded TA501. By 1994 the vehicle had been  repainted into blue with gold stripes and a white roof, with the new identity Terror Australis.

The other private sale was car 707, which had been a club car named Waterford under Australian Vintage Travel, and previously the Johnnie Walker Club Car under SteamAge. By 1992 it had been rebuilt as an observation car at Thirlmere in New South Wales, and coded ABM707. Since then it has been renamed Crux Australis.

Current whereabouts of both cars are unknown.

Steamrail Victoria
In 1998, Steamrail acquired the first six members of their ex-South Australian Railways fleet, with cars 500, 600, 702, 703, 751 and 782 purchased from Great Southern Rail and railed from Adelaide to Melbourne, then converted to broad gauge and moved to Newport Workshops. The cars were reclassed as AK500, BKL600, BK702, BK703, AK751 and ABK782; the latter two were unusual, as 751 had previously been a composite carriage and 782 exclusively first class. AK500, BK600 (no longer BKL) and BK702 were repainted into blue with gold; BK703 was retained in The Explorer livery, and the other two are not listed on the Steamrail website.

In 2004 Steamrail purchased the four carriages previously owned by West Coast Railway - BK700, BK709, BK711 and BK714. BK700 had been repainted to Victorian Railways blue by 2005, BK711 retained in West Coast Railway scheme, and the other two are not listed. In August 2010 expressions of interest were sought for the sale of BK714, which has since been moved to Tailem Bend.

Finally in 2010 the remnants of the Ritz Rail fleet were sold off. An auction initially saw many cars passed in, but Steamrail purchased dining cars Tweed (ex 601) and Richmond (ex 607) along with van CP24. After the sale, CP24 was swapped for sitting car Oxley (ex 502). At the same time, the power car was purchased by a private individual with connections to Steamrail.

Of the new acquisitions, Oxley, Tweed, Richmond and Power Car were railed to Islington railway Workshops for refurbishment in 2012, and emerged in a variant of Victorian Railways blue and gold with white roofs to distinguish them from the broad gauge stock. The cars were allocated codes, respectively AK502, DCK601, DCK607 and PCK713. There were stored for a time at Seymour in the SRHC compound, before being used on their first tour at the start of 2016, connecting with a broad gauge train at Ararat.

603, 604 and 605 were last seen stored around the Dimboola turntable; at some point previously, 605 had been fitted with marker lights.

707 Operations

At the sale of the Ritz Rail stock, car 708 was purchased by a private individual with connections to 707 Operations. The car has since been classed LCK.

Victorian Goldfields Railway
Car DC783 was acquired privately and restored to service on the Victorian Goldfields Railway in 2005, named Lowanna. It is permitted on the V/Line network, but a note in the network service plan addenda says that it "requires a clearance assessment prior to each path approval on V/Line Network. Only allowed on the V/Line Network with steps removed."

Espee Rail Services
As at 17 October 2016, Espee Rail Services was authorised to operate standard gauge trains in Victoria, using the passenger cars AK500 and 502, BK 600, 603, 604, 605, 700, 702, 703, 711, 712, 714 and 715, dining cars DCK 601 and 607, lounge car LCK708, power van PCK713 and supply vans CP24, 30 and 35. However, there is no evidence that cars 500, 600, 607, 700, 702, 708 and CP35 have been placed on standard gauge.

Model railways

HO Scale
A number of resin kits have been made available over recent decades, and these occasionally appear on eBay and similar sites.

In 2017 Trainbuilder announced a planned production of the group of cars, modelled in brass, retailing at $475 individually of $1900 for a set of four. Red and silver cars will include 500, 501, 601, 607, 707, 712, 753 and 780, along with a four-pack of 502, 603, 700 and 702. The SteamRanger preserved green & cream set will consist of 503, 602, 701 and 704, and the individual cars 502, 606, 706 and 710. Cars in blue and gold are AK1, BK1, BKL2 & BKL3, both as a set and individually; and all three West Coast Railways vehicles, 700, 711 and 714, are being released individually.

References

External links

Railway coaches of South Australia